Audrey Frances Peppe (later Benner, October 12, 1917 – April 1, 1992) was an American figure skater. She was the 1936 U.S. bronze medalist and 1938–1939 silver medalist. Peppe competed at the 1936 Winter Olympics, where she placed twelfth in the singles event. She turned professional in December 1939.

Peppe was the niece of Beatrix Loughran, who also coached her. In May 1940 she married David Benner but the marriage did not last. In 1944 she married Robert Rapee, son of symphony conductor Ernö Rapée. They had one child.

Results

References

1917 births
1992 deaths
American female single skaters
Olympic figure skaters of the United States
Figure skaters at the 1936 Winter Olympics
Sportspeople from New York City
20th-century American women
20th-century American people